Dictyophorus is the type genus of grasshoppers in the tribe Dictyophorini, of the family Pyrgomorphidae; it is native to sub-Saharan Africa. The genus was named by Carl Peter Thunberg in 1815.

Species
These species belong to the genus Dictyophorus:
subgenus Dictyophorus Thunberg, 1815
 Dictyophorus cuisinieri (Carl, 1916)
 Dictyophorus spumans (Thunberg, 1787) – koppie foam grasshopper
subgenus Tapesiella Kevan, 1953
 Dictyophorus griseus (Reiche & Fairmaire, 1849)
 Dictyophorus karschi (Bolívar, 1904)

References

Pyrgomorphidae
Caelifera genera